According to the Worldwide Cost of Living 2020  report issued by the Economist Intelligence Unit (EIU), Singapore, Hong Kong, and Osaka share the title of costliest city in the world. The list was prepared based on their Worldwide Cost of Living (WCOL) Index scores. The Worldwide Cost of Living survey was done in order to compare the cost of living indices in cities all over the world.

Methodology 

The list has been created based on the Worldwide Cost of Living data set. The data set comprises 400 individual prices of 160 products and services across 130 cities in 90 countries. Data set was created covering a wide range of products including food and beverage to household supplies,  personal care items to clothing. Services includes home rents to transport, utility bills and private schools to domestic help. The prices of commodities are gathered from three types of stores: supermarket, medium-priced retailers and more expensive specialty shops. Only those outlets were considered where the quality of the products are comparable to international standards. The prices of the services like house rents, transportation charges depends on several factors such as personal preferences and variety of choices. Therefore, the prices of these services are based on actual prices noted by the researchers. 
The prices were compared considering the New York as base city and all the prices were US dollars with the appropriate exchange rates at the time of survey

The top 10 costliest cities in September 2021

Price comparison for 10 years until 2020 

The price of 1kg loaf of bread [All prices are in USD]

References 

Cities-related lists of superlatives
 Moving and relocation
Economies by city